Walter Wassermann (19 September 1883 – 4 October 1944) was a German screenwriter. He also directed one film and acted in seven during the silent era. Wassermann was not of Jewish descent. Sigbert S. Prawer got him mixed up with the czech Writer Václav Wasserman whose "German" name was Wenzel

Selected filmography

 The Hotel of the Dead (1921)
 Deceiver of the People (1921)
 The Men of Frau Clarissa (1922)
 The Shadows of That Night (1922)
 The Queen of Whitechapel  (1922)
 The Woman from the Orient (1923)
 Time Is Money (1923)
 The Comedian's Child (1923)
 Heart of Stone (1924)
 Destiny (1925)
 Tragedy (1925)
 The Woman in Gold (1926)
 The Good Reputation (1926)
 The Awakening of Woman (1927)
 The Impostor (1927)
 It Attracted Three Fellows (1928)
 He Goes Right, She Goes Left! (1928)
 The Girl with the Whip (1929)
 Secret Police (1929)
 The Caviar Princess (1930)
 Of Life and Death (1930)
 The Blonde Nightingale (1930)
 Pension Schöller (1930)
 Twice Married (1930)
 Next, Please! (1930)
 Dangers of the Engagement Period (1930)
 The Rhineland Girl (1930)
 Ash Wednesday (1931)
 Storm in a Water Glass (1931)
 Such a Greyhound (1931)
 The Stranger (1931)
 The True Jacob (1931)
 The Unfaithful Eckehart (1931)
 Wibbel the Tailor (1931)
 The Escape to Nice (1932)
 A Night in Paradise (1932)
 The Testament of Cornelius Gulden (1932)
 Happy Days in Aranjuez (1933)
 Tell Me Who You Are (1933)
 The Big Bluff (1933)
 The Sandwich Girl (1933)
 The Page from the Dalmasse Hotel (1933)
 The Voice of Love (1934)
 Police Report (1934)
 Hearts are Trumps (1934)
 The Daring Swimmer (1934)
 Pygmalion (1935)
 She and the Three (1935)
 The Beggar Student (1936)
 Men Without a Fatherland (1937)
 Sergeant Berry (1938)
 Robert Koch (1939)
 Friedrich Schiller (1940)
 Kora Terry (1940)

References

Bibliography
 Prawer, S.S. Between Two Worlds: The Jewish Presence in German and Austrian Film, 1910-1933. Berghahn Books, 2005.

External links

1893 births
1944 deaths
German male screenwriters
German male film actors
Film people from Berlin
20th-century German screenwriters